Punjab Agricultural University (PAU) is a public funded agricultural university located in Ludhiana district of Punjab. It is a state agricultural university in India. It was established in 1962 and is the nation's third-oldest agricultural university, after Govind Ballabh Pant University of Agriculture & Technology, Pantnagar and Orissa University of Agriculture and Technology, Bhubaneshwar. It was formally
inaugurated by the then Prime Minister of India, Pandit Jawaharlal Nehru, on July 8, 1962. PAU pioneered the Green Revolution in India in the 1960s. It was bifurcated in 2005 with the formation of Guru Angad Dev Veterinary and Animal Sciences University (GADVASU). The Farmers Fair, which have been organised by the PAU since 1967, see the footfall of at least one lakh farmers in two days on PAU campus in Ludhiana, Punjab (bi-annually in March and September). The farmers from not only Punjab, but also from neighboring states such as Haryana, Rajasthan, Himachal Pradesh, etcetera travel to PAU campus to buy high-quality seeds, farm equipment and gain knowledge on new agricultural technologies in the two-day main fair event.

History

The university was established in 1962 to serve the state of erstwhile Punjab and was inaugurated by Pt. Jawahar Lal Nehru, Prime Minister of India on July 8, 1963.

Sports 

Punjab Agricultural University Stadium is a multipurpose stadium located in the campus. The stadium has facilities for cricket, football, hockey, and other sports. There is an astroturf field for hockey. In addition to this there is a swimming pool and a velodrome.

There are facilities for indoor sports such as basketball, badminton, gymnastics, handball, volleyball, lawn tennis, table tennis, weight lifting and Kabbadi etc. The Ground has also hosted 10 Ranji including a final in 1993 where Punjab defeated Maharashtra to win their only Ranji Trophy title and one Irani Trophy matches from 1987 to 1999 and 10 List A matches.

Notable alumni 

 Deep Saini
 Jaswinder Bhalla
 Gurbhajan Gill

 Gurmant Grewal
 Baldev Singh Dhillon
 Adesh Kanwarjit Singh Brar

 Khem Singh Gill

References

External links

 
Universities in Punjab, India
Education in Ludhiana
Science and technology in Ludhiana
1962 establishments in East Punjab
Educational institutions established in 1962